Schizasteridae is a family of echinoderms belonging to the order Spatangoida.

Genera:
 Abatus Troschel, 1851
 Aceste  Thomson, 1877
 Agassizia  Agassiz & Desor, 1847
 Aguayoaster  Sanchez Roig, 1952
 Aliaster  Valdinucci, 1975
 Amphipneustes  Koehler, 1900
 Brachybrissus  Pomel, 1883
 Brachysternaster  Larrain, 1985
 Brisaster  Gray, 1855
 Calzadaster
 Caribbaster  Kier, 1984
 Cestobrissus  Lambert, 1912
 Diploporaster  Mortensen, 1950
 Dipneustes  Arnaud, 1891
 Gregoryaster  Lambert, 1907
 Hemifaorina  Jeannet & Martin, 1937
 Hypselaster  H.L.Clark, 1917
 Kina Henderson , 1975
 Lambertona  Sanchez-Roig, 1953
 Linthia  Desor, 1853
 Lutetiaster
 Moira  A.Agassiz, 1872
 Moiropsis  A.Agassiz, 1881
 Neoproraster
 Opissaster  Pomel, 1883
 Ova  Gray, 1825
 Paraster  (Pomel, 1869)
 Protenaster  Pomel, 1883
 Prymnaster  Koehler, 1914
 Schizaster  L.Agassiz, 1835
 Schizopneustes  Thiéry, 1907
 Tripylaster  Mortensen, 1907
 Victoriaster

References

 
Spatangoida
Echinoderm families